Alakazam the Great, known in Japan as , is a 1960 Japanese anime musical film, heavily based on the 16th-century Chinese novel Journey to the West. It was one of the earliest anime films to be released in the United States. Osamu Tezuka was named as a director of the film by Toei Company, but Tezuka later stated that the only time he was in the studio was to pose for publicity photos. His involvement in promoting the film, however, led to his interest in animation.

Plot 
(The following synopsis follows the original Japanese version of the film, as the American adaptation heavily edits the original down)

One day, the God of China and the God of Japan watch as a special monkey is born from the stone. As this monkey grows and learns about the world, he meets and befriends Rin-Rin, his only friend and later love interest.

The two happen upon a land on monkeys, who are celebrating the coronation of a new possible king for their land. For if one monkey has the bravery to jump off the cliff of their waterfall and survive, they would rule the land. As all the other monkeys cowered in fear, the stone monkey gathered the courage to jump, only to land at the bottom. At the bottom of the waterfall, he is met with the "Water Curtain Cave", of which he takes the sign up back to air as proof of his findings, thus becoming the new king, with the Water Curtain Cave serving as his palace.

As he begins his rule, he becomes considerably rude and arrogant, much to the chagrin of his servants. As he walks around the palace, Rin-Rin informs the stone monkey of the human race, the smartest beings in the world, represented in the palace by a painting of a wise hermit. The next day, the stone monkey decides to journey to find this hermit and learn everything he knows.

After trekking up the mountain leading to "The Cave of Three Stars", the dwelling of the hermit, and fooling the guard of the hermit's home into letting him in, the stone monkey comes upon the hermit as he sleeps. After waking him up, the stone monkey threatens to burn his book of spells if the hermit does not teach him what he knows. The film then cuts to the end of his training, with the hermit now dubbing the stone monkey "Son Gokuu", and giving him a scroll of spells. Afterwards, Son Gokuu retreats to sleep for the night. 

The next morning, Rin-Rin arrives at The Cave to see Son Gokuu, who reveals to her his signature spell, being able to create anything out of thin air by way of plucking a strand of his hair. To further impress Rin-Rin, but much to her dismay, Son Gokuu goes to Heaven to retrieve heavenly fruit, which was sometimes fed to him by the hermit previously. 

As he arrives in Heaven, Son Gokuu ends up creating much trouble, mainly by way of eating forbidden fruit and being caught for thievery. To which the police then attempt to chase him as he tries to escape, only for Son Gokuu to easily overpower them by way of creating clones to individually fight each policeman. As he laughs at his success, Son Gokuu is then met and attacked by General Kinsei, who fights him with the powerful Nyoibo, a magical staff with the power to change size. However, Kinsei is distracted and eventually defeated by Son Gokuu after he shrinks into Kinsei's garb and tickles him, so that he may drop the staff, only to then take it for himself. After this victory, Son Gokuu is met by Jiroshinkun, who eventually loses to Son Gokuu after a battle between them takes place in which they both shapeshift into different animals and creatures.

Son Gokuu then flies towards the palace in Heaven, only to be met by a celestial figure who reminds him to not be overconfident in his strength. Taking this as a challenge, Son Gokuu responds by projecting his speed, to which he is challenged to see how far he may go in little time. As he flies, Son Gokuu finds five pillars, to which he then proceeds to mark them. It is then that the pillars are revealed to be the hand of the celestial figure, who Son Gokuu finds out to be Buddha. For his insolence, Buddha punishes Son Gokuu to be imprisoned in Mount Gogyou, and then places a talisman on a rock formation outside Son Gokuu's stone cell, stating that he will be freed once the talisman disappears.

During Son Gokuu's imprisonment, Rin-Rin periodically arrives with fruit from home, who comes face to face with an initially distant but gradually softer Son Gokuu. One such trip is not successful as she comes close to succumbing to the growing winter storm. However, her seemingly grim fate is intervened by Kanōn. She tells Rin-Rin that she will soon meet a monk, Hoshi Sanzō, who will save her, free Son Gokuu from his sentence and forgive his previous sins. But in return, Son Gokuu must accompany him on a pilgrimage to Tianzhu (an ancient name for India in Chinese). After initially reluctant and violently fighting back, Sanzō places a golden crown on Son Gokuu's head, which reins him in. After being assured that Sanzō wishes to travel with him and only him, Son Gokuu complies.

As the two begin to travel, they happen upon a village. In this village, a father tells the two that a horrifying monster wishes to marry his daughter and take her from his home that same night. In an effort to help, Son Gokuu transforms into an exact copy of the girl and takes her place in the nighttime encounter. Like clockwork that night, Chō Hakkai arrives to take the girl as his bride. After many a failed attempt to impress the false girl, Son Gokuu reveals his trickery and battles Hakkai in the skies via their own magic clouds, referred to as Kinto-un.

Chō Hakkai then rushes home to safety and to find his half-brothers, Ginkaku and Kinkaku. Only to find Shōryū, a servant of Gyū-Maō, seemingly here as a guest on official business with the brothers. Son Gokuu then knocks on their door, only to find the two brothers ready to take the monkey on. Though this battle is short-lived as they trap Son Gokuu into a magic jar which sucks him in and is said to be able to melt his body whole in a matter of a single minute. However, Son Gokuu is able to easily free himself by turning into a fly. Afterwards, he then proceeds to lure Hakkai towards a pot of stew, so they he may knock him out cold, leaving only Ginkaku and Kinkaku left to take care of by turning the magic jar onto them. However this is unsuccessful, as the two activate a trap door, dropping Son Gokuu a floor below. On this floor, Son Gokuu is met with the Scorpion Demoness, whom he very closely defeats. However, an observing Ginkaku and Kinkaku then leave themselves open to be finally sucked into the magic jar. Son Gokuu then finally confronts an awoken Hakkai, but is reminded by the words of Rin-Rin to be noble and merciful to a now surrendering Hakkai, who in return shall accompany Son Gokuu and Sanzō on their pilgrimage.

In the distance, Shōryū, who catches wind of the pilgrimage, informs Gyū-Maō of Sanzō's soon arrival towards his mountain home, as he wishes to eat him so that he may extend his life by a further 3000 years. Gyū-Maō then tasks Shōryū with following the group and luring them towards his lair in return for a handsome reward.

As Son Gokuu, Sanzō and Hakkai trek through the desert. Their gleeful walking musical number is interrupted by Shōryū scaring Sanzō's horse away from the group, and taking the monk hostage at knife-point, only for Son Gokuu to then ambush Shōryū and save Sanzō. Though this leaves the group without food, as in the ensuing chaos, Hakkai's Kinto-un could not completely handle the weight of his sack full of food, causing it to drag and rip, dropping every piece as it flew by.

After resting for the night, the group continues to trek through the desert and suddenly stumble upon an oasis. But while that turns out to be false, they stumble upon a castle, which Son Gokuu and Hakkai enter to explore. As they enter, they find a dining room choc full of food, though this is revealed to be a trap by the man-eating ogre, "Sa Gojō". Though as he prepares Hakkai to be eaten, he accidentally causes him to violently sneeze, allowing him and Son Gokuu to be freed and ready themselves for battle. As the two chase the ogre, he manages to escape via digging a tunnel with his staff, and then creating a tornado which as he escapes, he uses to whisk Sanzō away back into his castle so that he may eat him instead. Saving the monk, Son Gokuu transforms into an apple for Gojō to eat, only for Son Gokuu to beat on his organs until he surrenders and joins their pilgrimage as atonement.

As the now four man group treks through the dark desert, Shōryū updates Gyū-Maō on the situation, informing him on the team guarding Sanzō and how powerful they are. Gyū-Maō then orders Shōryū to make the three turn against each other so that they may leave the monk unguarded. He does this by masking his voice to replicate both Hakkai and Gojō, as well as throwing a rock towards Hakkai, making him think that the ogre punched him, resulting in a three-way brawl throughout the night. The next morning, the four continue their pilgrimage, now free from the desert and trekking a mountain range, though the three guards meet each other with pushes and shoves, to which Sanzō reminds them that they must get along and treat each other like brothers. Shōryū updates Gyū-Maō once more, informing him that the group are now in the vicinity of his mountain, to which he responds by erupting his volcano, causing havoc to the local wildlife and blocking the path for the four towards Tianzhu. A rabbit informs Son Gokuu upon his asking that the lava can be frozen over by way of the Basho-sen, which is in the possession of Gyū-Maō's wife, Ratsunyō. 

As Gojō digs a tunnel to safety, Son Gokuu and Hakkai plan a way to retrieve the Basho-sen. The two then disguise themselves as Gyū-Maō, who had just then left his dwelling for a hunt, leaving an opportunity for the two to strike. However bickering as they encountered a convinced Ratsunyō resulted in their stunt being revealed. Son Gokuu is able to retrieve the fan and escape, but Hakkai is trapped by Ratsunyō's dagger strikes. As Gokuu rushes back to Sanzō, he gives him the Basho-sen, only to be revealed that this Sanzō was instead a disguised Shōryū. In fact, the real Sanzō was captured by Gyū-Maō just before Son Gokuu's return. As the ruse is revealed, Shōryū freezes Son Gokuu with the Basho-sen and then pushes him into the lava. By sheer happenstance, the lava melts only the ice, leaving time for Son Gokuu to narrowly escape unscathed by the lava, albeit incapacitated and unable to perform any of his magic, with his legs being hard to move. Gojō returns from the tunnel to find Son Gokuu, who informs him of the situation. The two then enter the tunnel, which soon leads to Gyū-Maō's hideout, in which preparations and celebrations are being made for a giant feast for him and all his demon cohorts. The main course of which being both Sanzō and Hakkai, who are hung over a boiling pot.

During the preparations, Shōryū meets with Gyū-Maō in order to discuss his reward for his troubles, to which Gyū-Maō responds that he never said anything of the sort. As Shōryū reacts to this betrayal, Gyū-Maō captures and disposes of the oni. As Gojō and Son Gokuu finally make it to the hideout, Gojō breaks the jar that reveals Shōryū, who surrenders at staffpoint. Right before Gojō is about to kill him, Son Gokuu tells him to spare Shōryū, as he knows that Shōryū is admitting to his wrongdoings, thus showing that he finally truly realizes the humility that he once lacked. In return for his sparing, Shōryū gives Son Gokuu a potion that heals him and restores his magic, just in time for him and Gojō to save Sanzō and Hakkai right before the ropes they were hanging from are cut. However, this now leaves the group with having to battle Gyū-Maō and his legion of demons. As Son Gokuu takes on Gyū-Maō one-on-one, Hakkai and Gojō take on the rest of the demons, guarding Sanzō in the process. As Gojō takes out demon after demon, Ratsunyō secretly sneaks up on him with the Basho-sen, only for Hakkai to sneak up behind her and foil her attempt by instead freezing her.

The film then cuts back to Son Gokuu and Gyū-Maō, as they now fight in the air, with Gyū-Maō now transformed into a bull. After being pierced by multiple spears, Son Gokuu is able to cover Gyū-Maō's eyes with a red cape similar to one used by bullfighters, which causes him to drop into the pit of his volcano, seemingly killing himself.

Hakkai then is able to finally use the Basho-sen to freeze all the lava, and the group of four are finally reunited once more, winning the war against Gyū-Maō's forces. They then wave off a now hornless Shōryū, seemingly ridding himself of his former demon position and living a life of good. Afterwards, the group finally find themselves in Tianzhu, where Buddha and Kanon await them. The group are praised by the two deities, and Buddha then as promised, frees Son Gokuu from his curse, removing the golden crown from his head. The four return to China to celebrate their pilgrimage, with Son Gokuu finally returning to his kingdom to find a bedridden Rin-Rin, who awakes in delight at the return of her beloved, who then promises that he will be staying forever, and wishes for her to get better.

The film ends with the pair standing before their kingdom, a newly reformed Son Gokuu smiling and waving to his subjects, fading to black.

Characters

U.S. release 

The film was released in the United States by American International on July 26, 1961. For the American release, a few scenes were heavily edited and rearranged and bandleader Les Baxter was hired to compose a new soundtrack. Teen idol Frankie Avalon provided the singing voice of Alakazam (with speaking voice performed by Peter Fernandez), while Dodie Stevens provided the singing voice of DeeDee (with speaking voice performed by Corinne Orr), with English-language narration provided by Sterling Holloway. Other famous voices included Jonathan Winters and Arnold Stang. 

The largest differences however come from the plot. 

Initial narration from Sterling Holloway introduces Majutsu Land (Heaven in the original Saiyūki), a beautiful floating island high above the vicinity of Japan's coast, revered by magicians worldwide. The island is ruled by Supreme Wizard Extraordinaire, King Amo (Buddha) and Queen Amas (Kanōn), who also have a son, Prince Amat (Hoshi Sanzō), and under their rule, Majutsu Land was always very peaceful. Until the day that two Gods came upon the results of a previous premonition from King Amo of a new king of the beasts being born, referring to Alakazam (Son Gokuu), where compared to the original, Son Gokuu simply rose to power while initially being an monkey known to no one, save for his birth from a stone.

When Alakazam reunites with Dee-Dee (Rin-Rin) after his training with Merlin (Sen'nin/the hermit), he departs to Majutsu Land to challenge King Amo for the title of the strongest magician in all the land, rather than going on a simple trip to find heavenly fruit. With Celestial Police forces chasing him after his stealing of the heavenly fruit, leading to battles between an unnamed high-ranking officer (General Kinsei) and Hercules (Jiroshinkun), and the eventual first meeting between Alakazam and King Amo, who is surprised at the callousness of Alakazam, for his wanting to challenge his strength. King Amo eventually imprisons Alakazam much like the original, stating that he shall be his prisoner until he realizes the stupidity of conceit and selfishness.

During Dee-Dee's near-fatal fruit delivery to Alakzam's mountain cell, the king of the beasts prays for his love's survival, for his prayer to be met by Queen Amas, who tells her that her life shall be saved, and that Alakazam will be freed as long as he joins their son, Prince Amat, on a pilgrimage.

Upon arrival at the village, the father of the young unwilling bride informs the pair of Sir Quigley Broken Bottom (Chō Hakkai) and the McSnarles brothers, Herman and Vermin (Ginkaku and Kinkaku). His battle with Alakazam takes place as usual, and after his escape, he encounters Filo Fester (Shōryū), who introduces himself as counter-intelligence for King Gruesome (Gyū-Maō), on business with the McSnarles to retrieve their "secret weapon", the magic jar in which the brothers trapped Alakazam. 

Upon Alakazam's victory over the McSnarles and recruitment of Broken Bottom, Fester phones King Gruesome to inform him of Prince Amat's pilgrimage, so that Gruesome may hold Amat hostage, retrieve a ransom from King Amo and settle his score with him, and as a bonus, he won't have to worry about his wife "wears out mink soles like nylons".

As the trio continue to travel and escape the kidnapping attempt by Fester, Alakazam and Broken Bottom find themselves in Castle No-Hope-O, the home of Max Lulipopo (Sa Gojō). Though the two end up escaping, and Alakazam recruits Lulipopo much in the same manner.

As the four now travel through the dark nightscapes of the last legs of the desert, Fester phones King Gruesome once more to inform him of Prince Amat's entourage, who Gruesome sees as no more than "broken down bums", and orders Fester to try to make them fight amongst themselves.

The next morning, Fester informs Gruesome of the group's arrival, in which the King prepares a "surprise welcome" for them, the eruption of his volcano. An eruption that only be stopped the King's magic fan (the Basho-sen), which Alakazam retrieves from Queen Gruesome as per usual, with Hakkai's entrapment and the kidnapping of Prince Amat by King Gruesome.

After King Gruesome's celebrations begin, his revenge on King Amo beginning to be exacted, and his betrayal of Fester, Alakazam and Lulipopo enter the King's lair by way of a secret tunnel, uncover the trapped Fester, and spare him despite his wrongdoings, for Alakazam "at one time was no better, arrogant and wicked", referring to his rude and thoughtless rule over his kingdom. Fester gives Alakazam a potion that will immediately restore his magic, in time for him and Lulipopo to save Prince Amat and Broken Bottom from their seemingly boiling demise, but still has to battle both King Gruesome and his army of demons, like the original. After defeating Gruesome and freezing the lava, the now-reunited group wave off and say goodbye to a reformed Filo Fester, who now leads a life of good wherever he may be.

The four finally arrive at their destination (seemingly Majutsu Land, though it is never explicitly stated in the film, however the setting is identical to Tianzhu/India in the original film), where King Amo commends Alakazam, Broken Bottom and Lulipopo for saving Prince Amat, to which Queen Amas confirms that Alakazam has learned his lesson, and has learned the humility and wisdom he once lacked, and as such, King Amo officially frees Alakazam from his sentence, removing the golden crown from his head.

The four friends making their way back home, with Alakazam returning to his kingdom, greeting a bed-ridden Dee-Dee, who he promises that he is here to stay and to rule his kingdom forever, with her at his side. With the film ending much like the original, Alakazam looking down at his kingdom, now as a king fit to rule, with Sterling Holloway signing off, "Now wouldn't you just know that it would end like this? Everyone living happily ever after, and all that?", and fading to black.

Reception 
The film was a great success in Japan but a flop in the United States, despite a large marketing budget and heavy promotion. The Los Angeles Times called it "warm, amusing and exciting... the art work is really excellent". It was included as one of the choices in The Fifty Worst Films of All Time, and is the only animated film featured in the book.

Home media 
The AIP version of the film was first released on VHS in the 1980s by HBO/Cannon Video (under licensed from then-owner Orion Pictures). This release was reissued by Congress Video Group in 1990 at a slower speed. Orion Home Video re-released the film in both pan-and-scan and widescreen letterbox VHS editions and on a widescreen laserdisc in 1995. Although MGM Home Entertainment hasn't released the film on DVD, the AIP version has been made available for streaming on Netflix and Amazon Prime Video.

In popular culture 
The Mario video game franchise antagonist Bowser was inspired by the film. Nintendo designer Shigeru Miyamoto received inspiration for the character's appearance from the anime film. He had first envisioned Bowser as an ox, basing him on the Ox-King from the film.

See also 
 List of animated feature films
 List of Osamu Tezuka anime
 List of Osamu Tezuka manga
 Osamu Tezuka's Star System

References

External links 
 

1960 films
1960 anime films
1960s children's animated films
1960s fantasy adventure films
1960s musical films
Adventure anime and manga
American International Pictures films
Animated musical films
Buddhist animation
Chinese mythology in anime and manga
Films about apes
Films about pigs
Films based on Journey to the West
Films based on works by Osamu Tezuka
Films scored by Ryōichi Hattori
Japanese animated fantasy films
Japanese fantasy adventure films
Toei Animation films